Stubenberg is a municipality in the district of Rottal-Inn in Bavaria in Germany. It lies on the river Inn, close to the border with Austria.

References

Rottal-Inn
Populated places on the Inn (river)